The , more famously known as the , is a  long motorsport race track located in Ino, Suzuka City, Mie Prefecture, Japan and operated by Honda Mobilityland, a subsidiary of Honda Motor Co, Ltd. It has a capacity of 155,000.

Introduction

Soichiro Honda decided to develop a new permanent circuit in Mie prefecture in the late 1950s. It is one of only two FIA Grade 1 licensed tracks to have a "figure eight" layout, the other one being the Fiorano Circuit.

The circuit has been modified at least eight times:

In 1984 the first part of Spoon was made slightly slower and the corner was brought closer to the track to expand run-off area there, and in 1985 the first corner was made slightly slower.

In 1987 the circuit was brought up to F1 and Grand Prix motorcycle standards for both Japanese Grand Prixs of their respective championships, the F1 Grand Prix being the first held at Suzuka. The Degner curve was made into two corners instead of one long curve, and more crash barriers, more run-off areas were added, exposed vegetation was barricaded off and straw bales were removed (but still used for the Japanese motorcycle Grand Prix).

In 2002, the chicane was slightly modified, 130R (marked as 15 on the diagram) was also modified and some of the snake curves were made a bit straighter and faster; additionally, the runoff area at the Dunlop Curve was doubled from 12 metres to 25 metres, and the corner itself was made slightly tighter.

In 2003, the chicane was made slightly faster and closer to the 130R.

Following the death of Daijiro Kato at the 2003 Japanese motorcycle Grand Prix, Suzuka reconfigured the motorcycle variant of what is now known as the Hitachi Automotive Systems Chicane before the final turn, and added a second chicane, between the hairpin and 200R.

The circuit can be used in five configurations; the car full circuit, the motorcycle full circuit, the "Suzuka east," "Suzuka west car," and "Suzuka west motorcycle" configurations. The "east" portion of the course consists of the pit straight to the first half of the Dunlop curve (turn seven), before leading back to the pit straight via a tight right-hander. The "west" course is made up of the other part of the full circuit, including the crossover bridge; the straight leading to the overpass is used for the start/finish line and the grid.  The chicane between the hairpin and 200R separates the west and full course sections between cars and motorcycles.

The Degner curve was named in honour of Ernst Degner after he crashed his factory Suzuki 50 there during Suzuka's inaugural All Japan Championship Road Race meeting on 3 November 1962.

The hairpin (turn 11) was coined 'Kobayashi Corner' after Japanese driver Kamui Kobayashi passed five drivers with aggressive moves at the 2010 Japanese Grand Prix.

At the 2014 Japanese Grand Prix, F1 driver Jules Bianchi suffered serious injuries after colliding with a recovery vehicle, and died in hospital as a result nine months later. In the wake of the accident, the Dunlop corner was slightly changed and revised in safety standards, and the organisers of the Japanese Grand Prix installed a large crane in place of the tractor that Bianchi hit.

Motorsport events

Suzuka, openly touted by F1 drivers and fans as one of the most enjoyed, is also one of the oldest remaining tracks of the Formula One World Championship, and has a long history of races as venue of the Japanese Grand Prix since 1987. Its traditional role as one of the last Grands Prix of the season means numerous world championships have been decided at the track. Four years consecutively in its early history the circuit saw the world championship decided. These include the 1988 championship, which went to Ayrton Senna, the controversial 1989 championship, which went to Alain Prost, and the 1990 and 1991 world championships, which both went to Senna.

Suzuka and Fuji were to alternate hosting the Japanese Grand Prix from 2009.

The circuit closed for a year for renovations to make it F1-compliant for 2009, with the last major event held on November 18, 2007, although some annual events (for instance, the Suzuka 8 Hours and Suzuka 1000km) were still held. The track held a re-opening day on April 12, 2009.

Suzuka also hosts other motorsport events including the Suzuka 1000 km endurance race. Previously a part of multiple GT racing series including the now defunct group C class of the All Japan Sports Prototype Championship, the Suzuka 1000 km as of 2006 is now a points round of the Super GT Series, and is the only race of such length in that series. In 2010, the GT500 pole position time was 1:55.237. In 2007, the GT300 pole position time was 2:06.838.

Another major motorsport event is the Suzuka 8 Hours for motorcycles, which has been run since 1978. This event usually attracts big name riders and with the exception of 2005, due to the importance of the major manufacturers' involvement, the FIM ensures that no motorcycle races clash on the date.

NASCAR organized the NASCAR Thunder 100, a pair of exhibition 100-lap races on the east circuit, a  layout which utilizes the pit straight and esses, before rejoining the main circuit near the Casio triangle. The cars were Sprint Cup Series and Camping World West Series cars and the field was by invitation for the two races, run after the 1996 and 1997 seasons. The 1996 event was marred by tragedy when during practice, pace car driver Elmo Langley died of a heart attack in the Chevrolet Corvette pace car at the esses during an evaluation run. During qualifying for the 1997 race, rain caused Goodyear to use rain tires on Winston Cup cars for the first time in the modern era.

It was announced on June 21, 2010 that the east section of the Suzuka Circuit would host the Japan round of the 2011 WTCC season instead of the Okayama International Circuit.

130R corner 
Following two major accidents in 2002 and 2003, one of the main issues in safety has been at the corner 130R (marked 15 in the track map above). In 2002, Toyota F1 driver Allan McNish suffered a high-speed crash through the bump, which sent him through a metal fence; he was not seriously injured.

Track officials revised the 130R, redesigning it as a double-apex section, one with an  radius, and then a second featuring a  radius, leading to a much closer Casio triangle (chicane), with the chicane becoming a "bus stop" type for motorcycles.

However, the problem continued for the new revised section. During the 2003 MotoGP Grand Prix of Japan, the track's first major event since the revisions, MotoGP rider Daijiro Kato was killed when he crashed in the new section, on his way to the braking zone for the Casio triangle. MotoGP has not returned to Suzuka since the incident.

Track configurations

Events

 Current

 March: Super Taikyu
 April: Super Formula Championship, MFJ Superbike
 May: Formula Regional Japanese Championship, TCR Japan Touring Car Series
 June: Super GT, F4 Japanese Championship
 July: GT World Challenge Asia Fanatec Japan Cup, Ferrari Challenge Japan, GT4 Asia Series, Porsche Carrera Cup Asia, Super Formula Lights
 August: FIM Endurance World Championship Suzuka 8 Hours, Super GT, F4 Japanese Championship
 September: Formula One Japanese Grand Prix
 October: Super Formula Championship, MFJ Superbike MFJ Grand Prix, Super Taikyu

 Former

 Asia Road Racing Championship (2013–2019)
 BPR Global GT Series 1000km of Suzuka (1994–1996)
 F3 Asian Championship (2019)
 FIA GT Championship (1997–1998)
 Grand Prix motorcycle racing Japanese motorcycle Grand Prix (1987–1998, 2000–2003)
 Intercontinental GT Challenge Suzuka 10 Hours (2018–2019)
 International Touring Car Championship (1996)
 NASCAR Thunder Special Suzuka (1996–1997)
 World Sportscar Championship (1989–1992)
 World Touring Car Championship FIA WTCC Race of Japan (2011–2014)
 World Touring Car Cup FIA WTCR Race of Japan (2018–2019)

Lap records 
The official lap record for the current circuit layout is 1:30.983, set by Lewis Hamilton during the 2019 Japanese Grand Prix. Previously, the record was set in 2005 by Kimi Räikkönen with a time of 1:31.540 (albeit on a marginally longer, slightly different variation of the circuit). The unofficial all-time track record is 1:27.064, set by Sebastian Vettel during final qualifying for the aforementioned 2019 race.

The official fastest race lap records at the Suzuka Circuit are listed as:

In video games 

Along with Fuji Speedway, the Suzuka Circuit was one of the four tracks featured in the video game Pole Position II. The track is referred to in the Namco Museum versions of the game as the "Wonder Circuit" ("Orange Circuit" in Namco Museum: Virtual Arcade), after Namco's "Wonder" series of amusement parks, despite its logo appearing on the starter's box since 1983.

The Suzuka Circuit is also featured in the Final Lap series of games which first appeared in 1987. Another Namco racing game, Suzuka 8 Hours, based on the motorcycle race of the same name was released for arcades in 1992, followed by a port for the Super NES in 1993. It can also be seen in arcade games and video games such as Ferrari F355 Challenge, Super Monaco GP, Forza series, Gran Turismo series, RaceRoom, iRacing, R: Racing Evolution, Shift 2 Unleashed, Le Mans 24 Hours, The Cycles, MotoGP 3 of PlayStation 2, MotoGP 4, Tourist Trophy, Auto Modellista, Racing Battle: C1 Grand Prix, Real Racing 3, and as the final race in Taito's racing game Continental Circus. The east course was featured in NASCAR 98. Suzuka's Ferris wheel was paid homage in the "Big Forest Track" in Virtua Racing.  A mod for Mario Kart Wii, CTGP Revolution, exists that adds the track.

Project CARS and Project CARS 2 have a Japanese circuit inspired by Suzuka, called Sakitto Circuit. Sakitto has numerous visual differences from the original Suzuka, including the change of position of the Ferris Wheel near to Degner curves, as well as the absence of the Casio triangle and the Hairpin, a very modified esses section, and a road pass through the real life location of the Ferris Wheel.

Deaths

See also
 Twin Ring Motegi, another Honda-owned race track and oval, host to the FIM MotoGP Japanese Grand Prix

Notes

References

External links 

 Official website
 Suzuka track map and circuit history at RacingCircuits.info
 Suzuka at the Formula 1 site
 Suzuka Circuit History and Statistics
 Suzuka Circuit on Google Maps (Current Formula 1 Tracks)
 Audio walkthrough of the track, for use with games
 BBC Sport Suzuka Circuit Guide

Honda
Motorsport venues in Mie Prefecture
Suzuka
Suzuka
Japanese Grand Prix
NASCAR tracks
World Touring Car Championship circuits
Sport in Suzuka, Mie
1962 establishments in Japan
Sports venues completed in 1962

sr:Сузука